= Alfa Omega =

Alfa Omega is a Romanian broadcaster with a satellite channel and an IPTV station. It started as a distributor of programming working with more than 50 stations in both cable and terrestrial networks inside of Romania. It now also has operations in Moldova.
